A revolver is a type of firearm.

Revolver may also refer to:

Film and television
 Revolver (1973 film), an Italian film directed by Sergio Sollima
 Revolver (1992 film), a television film featuring Robert Urich
 Revolver (2005 film), a British film directed by Guy Ritchie
 Revolver Entertainment, a UK film distributor
 Revolver (TV series), a 1978 British music series presented by Peter Cook
 Revolver (2001 TV series), a British TV comedy sketch show featuring John Inman

Literature
 Revolver (DC Comics), a 2010 graphic novel published by DC Vertigo
 Revolver (Fleetway comics), a 1990–1991 British comic
 Revolver (magazine), a rock music publication
 "The Revolver", an 1895 short story by Emilia Pardo Bazán
 Revolver, a 1985–1986 Renegade Press comic pencilled by Steve Ditko
 RevolveЯ Quarterly, a comic and website by Salgood Sam
 Revolver, a 2010 psychological thriller novel by Marcus Sedgwick

Music

Groups and labels
 Revolver (British band), a 1990–1994 guitar group
 Revolver (French band), a pop rock band formed in 2006
 Revolver Music, a British record label
 Revolution Records (Canada), issued recordings as "Revolver".

Albums
 Revolver (Beatles album), 1966
 Revolver (The Haunted album), 2004
 Revolver (T-Pain album), 2011
 Revolver (EP), a comedy album by Lewis Black, 2002

Songs
 "Revolver" (song), by Madonna featuring Lil Wayne, 2009
 "Revolver", by the Donnas from Gold Medal, 2004
 "Revolver", by Hooverphonic from A New Stereophonic Sound Spectacular, 1996
 "Revolver", by Rage Against the Machine from Evil Empire, 1996
 "Revolver", by Warehouse Republic, with a video featuring Rachel Hurd-Wood, 2010

Other uses
 Revolver (Ferris wheel) or Wheel of Dublin, formerly in Dublin, Ireland
 Revolver Gallery, an art gallery in Los Angeles, California, US
 Revolver Island, Antarctica
 Nord 2.231 to 2.305, nicknamed "Revolver", a series of French steam locomotives

See also
 
 
 Revolve (disambiguation)
 Revolution (disambiguation)
 Rotation (disambiguation)